An ultramarathon, also called ultra distance or ultra running, is any footrace longer than the traditional marathon length of .

While some ultras are road races, most take place on trails, leading to a large overlap with the sports of trail running and mountain running.

Overview
There are two main types of ultramarathon events: those that cover a specified distance or route, and those that last for a predetermined period (with the winner covering the most distance in that time). The 100-kilometer race is recognized as an official world record event by the International Association of Athletics Federations (IAAF), the world governing body of track and field.

The format of these events and the courses vary, ranging from single loops (some as short as a  track), to point-to-point road or trail races, to cross-country rogaines. Many ultramarathons, especially trail events, have significant obstacles, such as inclement weather, elevation change, or rugged terrain. Many of these races are run on dirt roads or mountain paths, though some are run on paved roads as well. Usually, there are aid stations, perhaps every , where runners can replenish food and drink supplies or take a short break.

Timed events range from 6, 12, and 24 hours to 3, 6, and 10 days (known as multi-day events). Timed events are generally run on a track or a short road course, often one mile (1.6 km) or less.

There are some self-supported ultramarathon stage races in which each competitor has to carry all their supplies including food to survive the length of the race, typically a week long. An example of this is the Grand to Grand Ultra in the USA.
 
Many countries around the world have their ultrarunning organizations, often the national athletics federation of the country, or are sanctioned by such national athletics organizations. World best performances for distances, times, and ages are tracked by the IAU.

Racewalking events are usually 50 km, although 100 km and 100-mile (160 km) "Centurion" races are also organized. Furthermore, the non-competitive International Marching League event Nijmegen Four Days March has a regulation distance of 4 × 50 km over four days for those aged 19 to 49.

In 2021, concerns were raised about planning and medical care available for ultramarathons in China, after dozens of racers died from hypothermia and at least one from a heart attack while competing in an ultramarathon in the Yellow River Stone Forest. The government later announced a ban on "extreme" competitions.

IAU World Record performances
Until 2014, the IAU maintained lists of the world best performances on different surfaces (road, track, and indoor). Starting in 2015, the distinction between the surfaces was removed and the records were combined into a single category. Some governing bodies continue to keep separate ultramarathon track and road records for their jurisdictions.

Starting in January 2022, the IAU began to recognize and ratify performances as IAU World Records. World Athletics also began to ratify the 50k distance as a World Record for both mixed and women, respectively, along with 100k.

Record performances that have not yet been ratified are as follows.

At the Jackpot 100 US Championship in February 2022, Camille Herron set 12-hour and 100-mile marks of 151.111 km and 12:41:11, respectively. However, there were problems with the course arrangement and distance.

In September 2022, Aleksandr Sorokin improved his 24-hour record to 319.614 km at the IAU 24 Hour European Championships in Verona, Italy.

In October 2022, CJ Albertson ran 50 km in 2:38:43.

In February 2023, Joasia Zakrzewski ran 411.458 km in 48 hours at the Taipei Ultramarathon.

The IAU World Records as of January 2023 are as follows.

Men

Women

IAU World Championships
There are four IAU World Championships: the IAU 100 km World Championships, IAU 50 km World Championships, IAU 24 Hour World Championship, and the IAU Trail World Championships.

Record holders
The following is a selected list of world or national-record-holding, or world-championship-winning, ultramarathon runners.

 Al Howie, the record holder for the trans-Canada, 7295.5 kilometres in 72 days, 10 hours and 23 minutes
 Aleksandr Sorokin, IAU World Record holder for 12h, 100 miles, and 24h; Winner of the IAU 24 Hour World Championship and Spartathlon 
 Ann Trason, fourteen-time winner Western States 100; 2-time winner of the Comrades Marathon; American 100k record holder (7:00:48)
 Anna Frost, 2-time winner Hardrock 100, 2-time The North Face Endurance Challenge, Transvulcania, Maxi-Race du Lac d'Annecy
 Arthur F. H. Newton, 5 times Comrades Marathon winner
 Bongmusa Mthembu, 3-time winner of the Comrades Marathon and the Two Oceans Marathon, the African record holder for 100 km
 Bruce Fordyce, nine time Comrades Marathon winner
 Camille Herron, Only ultrarunner to win the 50 km, 100 km, and 24 Hour world championships; Comrades Marathon and JFK 50 Mile Champion; holds the IAU World Records for 50 miles (age 40–44), 100 miles, 12h and 24h
 Caroline Chaverot, winner of UTMB, Courmayeur-Champex-Chamonix, 2016 Trail World Championships, 2016 Skyrunning World Championships Ultra, 2-time Lavaredo Ultra Trail, Transgrancanaria, Maxi-Race du Lac d'Annecy, Hardrock 100, Eiger Ultra Trail, Madeira Island Ultra Trail and course record holder, and Festival des Templiers 
 Courtney Dauwalter, winner of Western States 100 and UTMB, former American 24-hour record holder
 Dan Lawson holds the course record for the 145-mile Grand Union Canal Race and in 2020 set the fastest known time for the 874-mile Land's End to John o' Groats.
 Don Ritchie, holder of the world best for 100 miles for 25 years, holder of the world best for 100 km for nearly 40 years
 Edit Bérces, 24-hour treadmill world record holder; holds several Hungarian records
 Elena Nurgalieva and her sister Olesya Nurgalieva have won a total of 10 Comrades Marathon titles between them
 Ellie Greenwood, 2-time IAU 100k Championship winner, Comrades Marathon winner, winner of Courmayeur-Champex-Chamonix and Festival des Templiers, holds course records at the Western States Endurance Run, JFK 50 Mile, and the Canadian Death Race
 François D'Haene, 3-time winner of UTMB and course record holder, 3-time winner of Grand Raid, 2-time winner of Madeira Island Ultra Trail and course record, Maxi-Race du Lac d'Annecy, runner-up at Western States 100
 Frith van der Merwe, set 50k World Best en route to winning the Two Oceans Marathon, continues to hold the downhill course record at Comrades Marathon
 Gerda Steyn, 2-time winner of the Two Oceans Marathon; set a new uphill course record winning the 2019 Comrades Marathon
 Ida Nilsson, 3-time winner Transvulcania and course record, 2-time The North Face Endurance Challenge, Swiss Alpine Marathon, and Ultravasan
 Jim Walmsley, 2-time winner and course record Western States 100, JFK 50 Mile and course record, Ultravasan, Tarawera Ultramarathon and 100k course record, Grand Canyon rim-to-rim-to-rim FKT
 Jo Zakrzewski, 2023 women's 48-hour world record distance of 411.458km (pending ratification) 
 Jonas Buud, 2015 IAU 100 km World Championships winner and 4-time silver medallist, 8-time winner of the Swiss Alpine Marathon, Ultravasan course record, 2nd at Comrades Marathon
 Kilian Jornet, winner of the UTMB, Western States 100 and Hardrock 100
 Lizzy Hawker, 5-time winner of Ultra-Trail du Mont-Blanc, 2006 IAU 100 km World Championships winner, Spartathlon winner, former 24h world best holder
 Mami Kudo, former women's 24h track world record holder (Soochow TPE, 2011), 2013 female winner of IAU 24 Hour World Championship
 Nikki Kimball, 3-time winner of the Western States Endurance Run, 2007 UTMB winner, 2014 Marathon des Sables winner
 Ollie Garrod, World Record Holder for 40 miles (Barry 40, 2023).
 Patrycja Bereznowska, 2017 IAU 24 Hour World Championship winner and former 24h world best holder; won and set course records at Spartathlon and Badwater Ultramarathon; set a 48h world best of 401k (249.17 miles)
 Pau Capell, winner of 2019 UTMB, 3-time Transgrancanaria
 Pete Kostelnick, best known for the male coast-to-coast FKT of the United States in 42 days, 6 hours, and 30 minutes, 2-time Badwater Ultramarathon
 Ragna Debats, gold at the 2018 and bronze at the 2016 Trail World Championships, winner of Marathon des Sables, Transvulcania, Courmayeur-Champex-Chamonix, and 2018 Skyrunning World Championship Ultra
 Rory Bosio, 2-time winner of UTMB and course record holder, Lavaredo
 Ruth Croft, winner of Courmayeur-Champex-Chamonix, 2-time winner and course record Orsières-Champex-Chamonix, Festival des Templiers and course record, silver at the 2019 Trail World Championships 
 Ryōichi Sekiya, four time IAU 24 Hour World Championship World Championship winner, two-time winner of Spartathlon
 Sandra Villines, best known for the female coast-to-coast FKT of the United States in 54 days, 16 hours, and 24 minutes, Badwater Ultramarathon
 Scott Jurek, 7-time winner of Western States 100, Hardrock 100, 2-time Badwater Ultramarathon, 3-time Spartathlon, former American record for 24Hr
 Shingo Inoue, 2010 winner of IAU 24-hour run World Championship
 Stu Mittleman, US record holder for a six-day race (578 miles)
 Sumie Inagaki, current women's 48h Track world record holder(Surgeres FRA, May 2010), two time female winner of IAU 24-hour run World Championship, two time female winner of Spartathlon
 Takahiro Sunada, former men's 100 km Road world record holder (6:13:33, Lake Saroma Ultramarathon, 1998)
 Ted Corbitt, "father of American ultrarunning"; 1952 US Olympic team member; former American world record holder at various distances
 Tomoe Abe, current women's 100 km Road world record holder (6:33:11, Lake Saroma Ultramarathon, 2000)
 Wally Hayward, multiple winner of Comrades Marathon, London to Brighton, and many other ultramarathons; set early world records
 Xavier Thévenard, only trail athlete to have won all four Ultra-Trail du Mont-Blanc races including 3-time winner of UTMB 
 Yiannis Kouros, often considered the best ultrarunner in history, at least in the longer track and road races, holder of numerous world bests from 24 hours to 1,000 miles, course record holder of the Spartathlon since its inception in 1983

Ultramarathons by regions
Ultra Marathons are run around the world with more than 600,000 people completing them every year.

Africa
Several ultra-distance events are held in Africa.

 Egypt has joined the Ultramarathon races with more adding up each year.
 Hathor 100 km is a Trail ultramarathon race in Sinaï. With distances of 50 km, 100 km, and 130 km.
 Qarun 66 km Trail Ultramarathon race. Dated on March of each year in the city of Faiyum with distances 44 km and 66 km.
 South Africa hosts a number of notable ultra marathon events. 
 Off-road: The Salomon Sky Run is a grueling  self-supported, unmarked trail race held in a particularly scenic part of the country.
 On a paved surface: the world's oldest and largest ultramarathon, the  Comrades Marathon. Approximately 12,000 runners complete the Comrades each year, out of approximately 17,000 who start, with 23,961 competing in 2000. 
 The  Two Oceans Marathon in Cape Town in the southern autumn attracts approximately 11,000 runners.
The Namib Race is a six-stage race that takes place along the Skeleton Coast in Namibia. It is part of the 4 Deserts Ultramarathon Series.
 The Washie 100 road race is the oldest one hundred miler road race in Africa.
 Trail: The Peninsula Ultra Fun Run (PUFfeR)  supported, unmarked trail run crossing the Table Mountain range in Cape Town South Africa.
This race attracts 2,350 competitors, with 1,000 runners from overseas.
 The Marathon des Sables is a 6-day stage race which covers  through the Sahara desert in Morocco. 
 The Spanish Canary Islands off the African coast are the location of some prestigious ultramarathons, including the 46-mile Transvulcania.

Asia
Ultrarunning has become popular in Asia, and countries such as Japan, Taiwan, and South Korea have hosted IAU World Championships.

 A night race called the Sundown Marathon has been held in Singapore annually since 2008, over a double marathon distance (84 km) up to 2010 and 100 km since then.
 Clark Freeport Zone in the Philippines is the venue for two of the Philippines' premier ultramarathon events.  The Clark Miyamit Ultra, known as CM50 a 60K and 50Mile Trail Ultramarathon that takes runners to traverse from Clark to the Aeta Villages, lahar bed, mountain ranges near Mt. Pinatubo and the iconic Miyamit Falls. Cardimax – Clark Ultramarathon is a road ultramarathon of 50K and 100K distances which brings and gathers ultramarathoners from aspiring ones to the most competitive elites.
 In Israel, two major ultramarathon races are Mount to Valley relay race; over 215 km, from the hills of the Upper Galilee to the Jezreel Valley, and the Valley Circle race in the Jezreel valley; contains several distances, including 160 km and 200 km.
 In the Cebu, Philippines, an All-Women Ultra Marathon race covering a distance of 50 kilometers is held annually on the weekend of International Women's Day since 2012.
 India's first ultra-marathon, the Bangalore Ultra was held in 2007. Since 2010, Indian Himalayas have hosted La Ultra – The High, a 333 km course crossing Khardung La, touted to be the world's highest motorable mountain pass.
 Indonesia's first ultramarathon race, Mount Rinjani Ultra (52K), was held in August 2013 and Indonesia's first 100K & 160K ultramarathon race, Bromo Tengger Semeru 100 Ultra, was held in November 2013. Tambora Challenge (320 km) held from 2015
Japan had its first 100 km event in 1987 as Lake Saroma Ultramarathon and hosted the IAU 100 km World Championship in 1994 (Lake Saroma), 1998 (River Shimanto) and 2005 (Lake Saroma). Japan hosts more than 50 ultramarathon events throughout the year, including the Trans Japan Alps Race (TJAR) ( with more than  cumulative altitude gain crossing Japan Alps, crossing Japan's mainland from Japan Sea to Pacific Ocean in 7 days), Hasetsune cup ( in steep foggy mountains) and the Ultra-Trail Mt. Fuji ( loop around World Heritage Mount Fuji with a cumulative altitude gain of about ).
 Malaysia's first ultra trail marathon was founded in November 2011 and is known as the TMBT (The Most Beautiful Thing) in Sabah at Mount Kinabalu, South East Asia's highest mountain. The event has a 55% dropout rate and is a 3-point qualifying race for UTMB and a 2-point qualifying race for the 55-kilometer category of the event. This was followed by the Beaufort Ultra Marathon in Sabah organized in 2012 and a 60-kilometer endurance run under 35-39-degree Celsius heat with a 60% finish rate amongst runners. First 100 miles ultra-marathon road race, Putrajaya 100 Miles, was held on 22–23 November 2014.
 Nepal hosts several ultramarathon races, including the Annapurna 100, the Kanchenjunga Ultra Marathon Trail Running Race and the Everest Ultra. Running a total of 1,504 km in a bit more than 24 days, Ryan Sandes and Ryno Griesel set a new fastest known time during March 2018 for the Great Himalaya Trail.
 Northern Mongolia hosts an annual 100 km summer race, Mongolia Sunrise to Sunset.
 Soochow International 24H Ultra-Marathon is held since 1999 in Taipei, and is an official IAU-registered event.
 South Korea's first ultramarathon was held in 2000.
 The Gobi March in northwest China was China's first ultramarathon, first staged in 2003. The Gobi March is part of the 4 Deserts Race Series.

Oceania, Australia, and New Zealand
Australia and New Zealand are hosts to some 100 organized ultramarathons each year.

Australia

In Australia, the Westfield Ultra Marathon was an annual race between Sydney and Melbourne contested between 1983 and 1991. Greek runner Yiannis Kouros won the event five times during that period. Australia is also the home of one of the oldest six-day races in the world, the Cliff Young Australian 6-day race, held in Colac, Victoria. The race is held on a 400-meter circuit at the Memorial Square in the centre of Colac and has seen many close races since its inception in 1984. The 20th Cliff Young Australian six-day race was held between 20 and 26 November 2005. The Coast to Kosciuszko inaugurated in 2004, is a  marathon from the coast to the top of Mount Kosciuszko, Australia's highest mountain.

Australia has seen a steep growth in ultrarunning events and participants in recent years. Many new races have come into inception, covering a range of ultramarathon distances from 50 km right through to multi-day events. The cornerstone of Australian Ultra events is such races as Ultra-Trail Australia 100, The Great North Walk Ultras, Surf Coast Century, Bogong to Hotham, Alpine Challenge, GC50 Run Festival, and the Cradle Mountain Run.  The Australian Ultra Runners Association (AURA) has a comprehensive list and links of events and their respective results.

New Zealand
New Zealand's first ultramarathon, called the Kepler Challenge, was held on a  trail through Fiordland National Park. It has been running since 1988 and is one of the country's most popular races. New Zealand's Northburn 100 ultra mountain run is the first 100-mile (160 km) race through the Northburn Station. The Te Houtaewa Challenge has a 62 km race on a ninety-mile beach, in Northland. The runners have to contend with rising tides and soft beach sand and the March race dates often mean the race is run in the cyclone season. In 2014 the ultramarathon was postponed because of Cyclone Lucy. The Tarawera Ultramarathon is currently one of the most competitive ultras in New Zealand and part of the Ultra-Trail World Tour.

In December 2013 in Auckland, Kim Allan ran 500 km in 86 hours, 11 minutes, and 9 seconds, breaking the  women's record.

In April 2013, a Feilding man, Perry Newburn, set a new New Zealand record by running  without sleep at Feilding's Manfeild Park.

Ultramarathon running in New Zealand has a national body: the New Zealand Ultrarunners Association.

Oceania
New Caledonia Trail Festival has several annual ultramarathon including the Ultra Trail New Caledonia 136 km / 6 000m D+ and the Endurance Shop Trail race 70 km / 3 000m D+ on Pentecost long Week end. The Trail des Cagous is another 60 km ultramarathon held in April.

Papua New Guinea has the Kokoda Challenge Race, an annual 96 km endurance race held in late August that runs the length of the historic Kokoda Track.

Papua New Guinea also has the Great Kokoda Race, a multi-stage 96 km (3-day) race held in early July where competitors run or walk the length of the Kokoda Track.

Europe
In Europe, ultrarunning can trace its origins to early documentation of ultrarunners from Icelandic sagas, or ancient Greece from where the idea of the Marathon, and the Spartathlon comes.  The history of ultrarunners and walkers in the UK from the Victorian Era has also been documented. The IAU hosts annual European Championships for the 50 km, 100 km and 24 hours. The European Ultramarathon Cup is an annual cup event covering some of the biggest ultramarathon races in Europe. Also worth mentioning is the ultramarathon CajaMar Tenerife Bluetrail, the highest race in Spain and second in Europe, with the participation of several countries and great international repercussions. Besides trail ultramarathons, Europe features large road ultramarathons such as Spartathlon and the Millau 100K, which have gathered thousands of runners for the past 50 years.

There are over 300 ultramarathons held in Europe each year,.
This includes the Harz Run in the Harz Mountains, the Irish Connemarathon, the British Spine Race and Welsh Dragon's Back Race which covers 315 km with 15,500m of height gain.

The UTMB, through France, Italy, and Switzerland has been considered the world's most competitive trail ultra. The other races in the UTMB festival, including the CCC, TDS, and OCC, are also significant events in the ultrarunning calendar.

In 2021 the Megarace was held. The race was 1001 km and was planned to be held on trails through Germany, Czech Republic, and Austria.  Due to Covid, 2021, the course was modified to only go through Germany.

Antarctica
Due to logistics and environmental concerns, there are only a handful of ultramarathons held in Antarctica, and travel costs can mean entrance fees as high as  $14,000.
Ultramarathons in Antarctica include The Last Desert, part of the 4 Deserts Race Series, a multi-stage footrace, and the Antarctic Ice Marathon – a marathon and 100-kilometer race.

North America
There are several hundred ultramarathons held annually in North America. One of the best known is the Western States Endurance Run, the world's oldest 100-mile trail run that is still held. The race began in 1977, founded by Wendell Robie, of Auburn California.

The first mountain trail ultramarathon held in the United States was the 1911 Mount Baker Race (50K), in Bellingham, Washington. Runners raced by car or train to the trailheads, ran up and down Mount Baker 10,000 feet, and then returned to the city.

An early ultramarathon was held in Mexico in 1926, and at the time was part of the Central American Games. Tomas Zafiro and Leoncio San Miguel, both Tarahumara Indians, ran 100 km from Pachuca to Mexico City in 9 hours and 37 minutes. At the time, the Mexican government petitioned to include a 100 km race in the 1928 Summer Olympics in Amsterdam.

In 1928, sports agent C. C. Pyle organized the first of two editions of the 3,455-mile-long Bunion Derby (the first went along U.S. Route 66 from Los Angeles to Chicago before heading toward New York; the 1929 Derby reversed the route). Neither the race nor the accompanying vaudeville show was a financial success.

In the 1980s, Gary "Lazarus Lake" Cantrell and Karl "Raw Dog" Henn conceived the Barkley Marathons, an annual trail race held in March or April in Frozen Head State Park, Tennessee. The course is approximately 20 miles long with approximately 11,000 feet of vertical climb, and runners have 60 hours to complete five laps. The run is notorious not only for its difficulty but also for its secretive nature; entrants must undergo a selection process and entry dates and requirements are not announced, meaning entrants rely on word-of-mouth for details on how to enter. The first Barkley Marathons took place in 1986, and as of 2022, only fifteen runners have ever completed the 100-mile course.

Since 1997, runners have been competing in the Self-Transcendence 3100 Mile Race, which is billed as the longest official footrace in the world.

The latest Trans-American Footrace (2015) winner was Robert HP Young (Marathon Man UK), winning in a time of 482 hours and 10 minutes.

In April 2006, the American Ultrarunning Hall of Fame was established by the American Ultrarunning Association (AUA). Candidates for the Hall of Fame are chosen from the 'modern era' of American ultras, beginning with the New York Road Runners Club 30 Mile race held in 1958. The Inaugural inductees were Ted Corbitt, a former US Olympian, winner of the aforementioned race in 3:04:13, and co-founder of the Road Runners Club of America, and Sandra Kiddy, who began her ultra career at age 42 with a world record at 50 kilometers, 3:36:56, and who went on to set a number of US and world ultra records.

The Yukon Arctic Ultra is described as the coldest and toughest ultra in the world, requiring racers to start from Whitehorse to Dawson City, Yukon, a distance of 430 miles (692 km) in 13 days under the territory's extremely cold conditions in February.

South America
There are a small number of ultramarathons in South America, but participation in the sport is increasing. This is a Badwater "sister race".
Several ultramarathons are held in Chile and with both local and international participation. Ultramarathons held in Chile include:
Atacama Xtreme 50K, 80K, and the first 100 Miles in Chile. One loop for each distance starting and finishing in San Pedro de Atacama at an avg. of 2,400 above sea level.
 The Atacama Crossing, established in 2004, a 250 km (155-mile) ultramarathon which takes place in the Atacama desert, around San Pedro de Atacama, Chile, and crosses through the driest place on earth. There are six stages in seven days, with almost four marathons running in the first four days, then a 74 km stretch, then a rest day, and a final stage of 11 km. It is part of the 4 Deserts Series. The race covers rugged terrain, with a harsh climate and an altitude that averages 2500 m (8000 ft). The race uses the town of San Pedro de Atacama as its host town, and in 2012 the race began at its highest point of over 3,000m in the Arcoiris Valley.
 The Endurance Challenge, a 10K, 21K, 50K, and 80K trail running race held in the Andes mountain range near Santiago. It is part of the global Endurance Challenge circuit. The race seeks to promote the sport, outdoor activity, and the use of mountain trails, taking care to have the lowest impact possible on the environment.
 The Lican Ray-Villarrica Ultramarathon, a 70 km marathon that starts in Lican Ray, climbs Villarrica Volcano and ends in downtown Villarrica.

 "Extreme Challenge Peru Ultra" at 210 km, 105 km, 50 km and 25 km. This is a race where participants run for 5 consecutive days traveling to Sierra (9,000 to 11,000 feet elevation), the desert (running on top desert dunes), the coast, and the last day at the high elevation jungle (5,900 feet elevation). Some participants also run shorter distances.
 The Patagonian International Marathon, organized by NIGSA, takes place in Torres del Paine National Park, southern Chilean Patagonia. The event features four race distances: an ultramarathon (63 km), a marathon (42 km), a half marathon (21 km), and a 10K. Each distance has a different starting point, but everyone finishes in the same place. The event has the secondary goal of promoting the conservation of Chilean Patagonia and contributing to the sustainable development of the region through the planting of trees in the Torres del Paine National Park through the "Corre y Reforesta" (Run and Reforest) campaign run by the organization "Reforestemos Patagonia"  (Let's Reforest Patagonia) 
 The Rapa Nui GrandTrail, an 80k ultramarathon that takes place on Easter Island, Valparaíso Region, Chile. This exotic trail, far out in the Pacific Ocean, takes in the famous Moai statues of the island.

Argentina
There are several ultramarathon races in Argentina.

La Mision has been going on for almost 15 years. There are different editions, one in Villa La Angostura in Patagonia with 3 distances. 110 km with cumulative altitude gain of about 4500m, 160 km with cumulative altitude gain of about 8000m and 200 km with cumulative altitude gain of about 9000m. There is other edition of the race (Short & Half) in Villa San Javier, Cordoba with 2 distances, 35k and 70k.

In April 2019 for the 1st time UTMB took place in Ushuaia (Ushuaia by UTMB) A very tough race facing the wild Patagonia weather with 4 different distances, 35k, 50k, 70k and 130k. The race brings together in one competition all the landscapes and geographies of the southern Andes (forests, rocky terrains, mountains, hills, glaciers, lakes, rivers, and wetlands, among others) The race has a technical, non-stop format and is ruled by the principle of semi-autonomy.

Cerro Champaqui in Cordoba is the landscape of different races. Champa Ultra Race with 5 different distances, 8k / 18k / 26k / 42k, and 62k. Also the UTACCH – Ultra Amanecer Comechingón with 7 different distances, 16k, 26k, 42k, and 4 ultras of 55k, 70k, 110k, and 100 miles.

Ushuaia, at "the end of the world" also hosts Ultra Maratón Glaciar Martial with 3 different distances, 10k, 25k, and 50k.

International Trail Running Association
Many ultramarathon organizers are members of the International Trail Running Association (ITRA), an organization that promotes values, diversity, health, and safety during races, as well as working to further the development of trail running and helps to coordinate between the national and international bodies with an interest in the sport. ITRA also evaluates the difficulty of specific ultramarathon routes according to a number of criteria, such as the distance, the cumulative elevation gain, and the number of loops and stages. ITRA maintains a calendar of ultramarathon events.

See also

 Fastpacking
 Fell running
 List of ultramarathons
 Skyrunning
 Trail running

References

External links

 Official International Trail Running Association website
 RunUltra.co.uk Global ultramarathon calendar with reviews
 The history of ultrarunning
 Ultra running at IAAF web site
 ULTRAmarathonRunning.com Global ultramarathon calendar
 UltraSignup, global race list and signup site

Endurance games
Long-distance running
Road running distances
Ultrarunning